Edina Kotsis (born 27 June 1990) is a Hungarian taekwondo practitioner. 

She won a bronze medal in featherweight at the 2015 World Taekwondo Championships, after being defeated by Eva Calvo in the semifinal. Her achievements at the European Taekwondo Championships include a silver medal in 2012; she also participated in 2008, 2010, 2014, and 2018.

References

External links

1990 births
Living people
Hungarian female taekwondo practitioners
European Games competitors for Hungary
Taekwondo practitioners at the 2015 European Games
World Taekwondo Championships medalists
European Taekwondo Championships medalists